The Cobden Football Netball Club, nicknamed the Bombers, is an Australian rules football and netball club based in the town of Cobden, Victoria. The club teams currently compete in the Hampden Football Netball League, which Cobden is a founding club, with its football squad having played there since 1930.

Premierships

 Corangamite Football Association (2):
 1891, 1915
 Hampden Football Netball League (6):
 1930, 1933, 1948, 1949, 1997, 1998

Maskell Medallists
John Couttie 1952
Hugh Worrall 1970, 1972 & 1979
Peter Anson 1985
Stephen Hammond 1996
Wayne Robertson 1998
Levi Dare 2010 & 2012
Joseph Dare 2012

Leading goalkickers
Kevin Scanlon 1930 (102)
Keith Wade 1939 (88)
Vic Jones 1947 (41)
Vic Jones 1948 (64)
Gavin Moran 1958 (71)
Chris Nash 1979 (83)

Notable players
VFL/AFL players recruited from Cobden include -
Alistair Lord (Geelong)
Stewart Lord (Geelong)
Thorold Merrett (Collingwood)
John Rantall (South Melbourne)
Ben Cunnington (North Melbourne)
Gary Rohan (Geelong)
Jackson Merrett (Essendon)
Zach Merrett (Essendon)
Sean Darcy (Fremantle)

Bibliography
 Evergreen Hampden: The Hampden Football League and its people, 1930-1976 by Fred Bond & Don Grossman, 1979 – 
 History of Football in the Western District by John Stoward – Aussie Footy Books, 2008 –

References

External links

 Official website
 SportsTG site

Sports clubs established in 1879
Australian rules football clubs established in 1879
Hampden Football League clubs
Netball teams in Victoria (Australia)
1879 establishments in Australia